Charles Rock (30 May 1866 – 12 July 1919) was a British actor. He was born Arthur Charles Rock de Fabeck.

Rock also wrote at least one play: The Ghost of Jerry Bundler, adapted from W. W. Jacobs' story Jerry Bundler. It was cast at the Haymarket Theatre Sept. 9, 1902, with Rock starring as the character George (waiter).

Selected filmography
 She Stoops to Conquer (1914)
 The Third String (1914)
 The Black Spot (1914)
 Called Back (1914)
 The Christian (1915)
 The Firm of Girdlestone (1915)
 The Prisoner of Zenda (1915)
 Rupert of Hentzau (1915)
 Beau Brocade (1916)
 A Fair Impostor (1916)
 Esther (1916)
 Partners at Last (1916)
 The Hypocrites (1916)
 The Romance of Old Bill (1918)
 A Romany Lass (1918)
 The Chinese Puzzle (1919)

References

External links
 
 

1866 births
1919 deaths
English male film actors
English male silent film actors
20th-century English male actors